The greenback guavina (Bunaka gyrinoides) is a species of fish in the family Eleotridae that inhabits fresh, marine, and brackish waters in estuaries and mangrove swamps from Sri Lanka to Micronesia and Australia. This species is the only known member of its genus.

References

External links
 Photograph

Eleotridae
Monotypic fish genera
Fish described in 1853